2023 Uttarakhand municipal general elections are expected to be held in late 2023 to elect members of all 102 municipalities in the state. There are 9 Municipal Corporations, 43 Municipal Councils and 50 Nagar Panchayats in the state of Uttarakhand.

References

External links
State Election Commission

Local elections in Uttarakhand
2023 elections in India